The chergui or sharqi is the name of a continental easterly or southeasterly wind which blows on the southernmost part of Morocco, a hot and dry wind coming from the Sahara Desert. This wind can be compared with the sirocco, a very hot and very dry desert wind. The Arabic word means "coming from the east", as the chergui emanates from the desert east of the Atlas Mountains. This is a rain shadow wind as it falls down after passing over the top of the mountain range as a very hot and dry air into the coastal plains area towards the Atlantic ocean, which brings soaring temperatures typical of the desert, often over 40 °C (104 °F) and can even turn around 48 °C (118.4 °F) during the day at summertime and the relative humidity is extremely low, nearly always below 15%. The chergui can also more rarely blow at wintertime, and is responsible of a warm, sunny and dry weather.

External links 
 Chergui (or Sharqi) on weatheronline.co.uk, last accessed 20 July 2011.

Maghreb
Geography of North Africa
Geography of Morocco
Wind